Çinarlar (also Chinarlar) is a village in the Davachi Rayon of Azerbaijan.  The village forms part of the municipality of Düz Bilici.

References 

Populated places in Shabran District